Eucratoscelus is a genus of East African tarantulas that was first described by Reginald Innes Pocock in 1898.  it contains two species, found in Tanzania and Kenya: E. constrictus and E. pachypus.

See also
 List of Theraphosidae species

References

Theraphosidae genera
Spiders of Africa
Taxa named by R. I. Pocock
Theraphosidae